The Fifteen Billion Pound Railway is the title of a British TV documentary series about the construction of a section of the Crossrail railway line which tunnels beneath central London. The first series was produced by Windfall Films and released in the UK in July 2014.

It was aired by SBS in Australia, as London's Super Tunnel, commencing in November 2014.

A second series started airing in May 2017.

A third series aired in February 2019.

A fourth series, covering the testing and snags in the eventual run-up to public opening, aired in June 2022.

Episodes

References

External links 
 
 

2014 British television series debuts
2022 British television series endings
2010s British documentary television series
2020s British documentary television series
BBC television documentaries
Crossrail
Documentary television series about technology
English-language television shows
Documentary television series about railway transport